Ryan Sean O'Donohue (born April 26, 1984) is an American actor. He is most notable for his performances as a voice actor in many Disney projects especially as Demyx in the Kingdom Hearts video game franchise. As a live-action actor, he was part of the main cast of The Byrds of Paradise.

Early life and career
O'Donohue was born in Pomona, California on April 26, 1984 to Anita Lynne (née Rultenberg) and Sean Patrick O'Donohue. He was raised in San Dimas, California. He has a younger sister named Windy.
O'Donohue played Zeke Byrd on the 1994 ABC drama The Byrds of Paradise, filmed in Hawaii. TV producer Steven Bochco was one of the show's executive producers.

Personal life
O'Donohue married Veronica Faye Dean in June 2004. They have one child, a daughter, named Hazel Ryan O'Donohue, who was born in December 2004. They live in Los Angeles, California.

Filmography
He has been credited with voice acting in 29 films.
 The Byrds of Paradise (TV series) (1994) — Zeke Byrd
 The Boys Are Back (TV series) (1994–1995) — Peter Hansen
 Demon Knight (1995) — Danny
 What-a-Mess (1995) — What-A-Mess,  Santa
 Disney's Activity Center: The Lion King (1995) — Young Simba (voice)
 Spot's Magical Christmas (1995) — Spot
 Toy Story (1995) — Kid
 Recess (TV series) (1997–2001) — Randall Weems/Digger Dave
 101 Dalmatians: Escape from DeVil Manor (1997) — Whizzer
 The New Batman Adventures (1997) — Matt
 Safety Patrol (1998) — Coop
 Beverly Hills Family Robinson — Roger Robinson
 Mr. Murder — Young Alfie
 A Bug's Life (1998) — Grub
 The Lion King II: Simba's Pride (1998) — Young Kovu
 The Dog of Flanders (1999) —  Young George (English dub)
 The Iron Giant (1999) — Student
 Toy Story 2 (1999) — Additional Voices
 Batman Beyond: The Movie (1999) — Matt McGinnis
 Batman Beyond: Legend of the Dark Knight
 Batman Beyond: Return of the Joker (2000) — Matthew "Matt" McGinnis
 Batman Beyond (1999–2001) — Matt McGinnis
 Recess: School's Out (2001) — Digger Dave/Randall Weems
 Kingdom Hearts II (2006) — Demyx
 Whisper of the Heart — High School Student
 Kingdom Hearts II Final Mix — Demyx
 Kingdom Hearts 358/2 Days (2009) — Demyx
 Kingdom Hearts HD 1.5 Remix (2013) — Demyx
 Kingdom Hearts HD 2.5 Remix (2014) — Demyx
 Kingdom Hearts III (2019) — Demyx
 Penguin's Clean Sweep

From 1993 through 2017, he has been credited as a voice in four video games.

Awards and nominations
O'Donohue was nominated for the Best Young Performer in a Voice-Over award at the 19th Youth in Film Awards, for his performance in the 1996–1997 season of Recess.

References

External links
 O'DONOHUE, Ryan 1984– Encyclopedia.com
 
 Video Montage of Ryan O'Donohue voice work

1984 births
Living people
21st-century American male actors
American male child actors
American male video game actors
American male voice actors
People from Pomona, California
American people of Irish descent